DirectVobSub (formerly known as VSFilter) is a software add-on for Microsoft Windows (a DirectShow filter) that is able to read external subtitle files and superimposes them on a playing video file.

DirectVobSub/VSFilter were formerly part of a whole application known as VobSub which was also able to extract subtitles from DVD Video and create text-based subtitles, without ripping the DVD to a file first. The last version of VobSub was version 2.23, after which the development of VobSub ceased. VSFilter was a part of the guliverkli project on the SourceForge web site.  The guliverkli project also includes the ability to extract subtitles from a DVD via the vobsub ripper program. However, development of guliverkli ceased in 2005 with version 2.37. In 2007, it became a part of the Guliverkli2 project, now known as DirectVobSub, starting with version 2.38. But till September, 2012, the last guliverkli2 commitment was on April 10, 2011. Then, the MPC-HC project took over the sources. Under that project, DirectVobSub was very briefly in active development again, but MPC-HC shut down in 2017 due to a lack of developers.

DirectVobSub is also capable of extracting subtitles from a DVD without ripping it to a file first.  
"Vobsub rippers" are also available for the same effect. Note also the guliverkli project has a related project VSrip.

Supported Subtitle formats

See also 
 Media Player Classic

References

External links 
 Official guliverkli project homepage
 Official Guliverkli2 project homepage
 VSFilterMod – continuation of VSFilter subtitle renderer
 Threaded-VSFilter - Threaded version of VSFilter 
 xy-VSFilter - VSFilter Fork for Smooth Playback
 libass – Portable ASS/SSA subtitle renderer

Subtitle file formats
Windows multimedia software